Oliver Twist; or, The Parish Boy's Progress, is the second novel by English author Charles Dickens. It was originally published as a serial from 1837 to 1839, and as a three-volume book in 1838. The story follows the titular orphan, who, after being raised in a workhouse, escapes to London, where he meets a gang of juvenile pickpockets led by the elderly criminal Fagin, discovers the secrets of his parentage, and reconnects with his remaining family.

Oliver Twist unromantically portrays the sordid lives of criminals, and exposes the cruel treatment of the many orphans in London in the mid-19th century. The alternative title, The Parish Boy's Progress, alludes to Bunyan's The Pilgrim's Progress, as well as the 18th-century caricature series by painter William Hogarth, A Rake's Progress and A Harlot's Progress.

In an early example of the social novel, Dickens satirises child labour, domestic violence, the recruitment of children as criminals, and the presence of street children. The novel may have been inspired by the story of Robert Blincoe, an orphan whose account of working as a child labourer in a cotton mill was widely read in the 1830s. It is likely that Dickens's own experiences as a youth contributed as well, considering he spent two years of his life in the workhouse at the age of 12 and subsequently, missed out on some of his education.

Oliver Twist has been the subject of numerous adaptations, including a 1948 film of the same title, starring Alec Guinness as Fagin; a highly successful musical, Oliver! (itself adapted into a multiple Academy Award-winning 1968 motion picture), and Disney's animated film Oliver & Company in 1988.

Publications
The novel was first published in monthly instalments, from February 1837 to April 1839, in the magazine Bentley's Miscellany. It was originally intended to form part of Dickens's serial, The Mudfog Papers. George Cruikshank provided one steel etching per month to illustrate each instalment. The novel first appeared in book form six months before the initial serialisation was completed, in three volumes published by Richard Bentley, the owner of Bentley's Miscellany, under the author's pseudonym, "Boz". It included 24 steel-engraved plates by Cruikshank.

The first edition was titled: Oliver Twist, or, The Parish Boy's Progress.

Serial publication dates:
 I – February 1837 (chapters 1–2)
 II – March 1837 (chapters 3–4)
 III – April 1837 (chapters 5–6)
 IV – May 1837 (chapters 7–8)
 V – July 1837 (chapters 9–11)
 VI – August 1837 (chapters 12–13)
 VII – September 1837 (chapters 14–15)
 VIII – November 1837 (chapters 16–17)
 IX – December 1837 (chapters 18–19)
 X – January 1838 (chapters 20–22)
 XI – February 1838 (chapters 23–25)
 XII – March 1838 (chapters 26–27)
 XIII – April 1838 (chapters 28–30)
 XIV – May 1838 (chapters 31–32)
 XV – June 1838 (chapters 33–34)
 XVI – July 1838 (chapters 35–37)
 XVII – August 1838 (chapters 38–part of 39)
 XVIII – October 1838 (conclusion of chapter 39–41)
 XIX – November 1838 (chapters 42–43)
 XX – December 1838 (chapters 44–46)
 XXI – January 1839 (chapters 47–49)
 XXII – February 1839 (chapter 50)
 XXIII – March 1839 (chapter 51)
 XXIV – April 1839 (chapters 52–53)

Plot 

Oliver Twist is born into a life of poverty and misfortune, raised in a workhouse in the fictional town of Mudfog. The children working there receive very little food; after six months, they draw lots, with the loser asking for another portion of gruel. Oliver is designated, and so he approaches workhouse manager Mr. Bumble and humbly requests another serving. A great uproar ensues at this perceived act of rebellion. 

Oliver is removed from the workhouse and sent into the service of undertaker Mr. Sowerberry. One day, clumsy co-apprentice Noah Claypole insults Oliver's mother and an enraged physical altercation ensues. Oliver runs away to London to seek a better life.

Oliver falls in with an infamous criminal known as Fagin, who trains orphan boys as pickpockets. During his training, Oliver is apprehended by his intended victim, an old gentleman named Mr. Brownlow. Brownlow takes Oliver home and cares for him. As Oliver recovers, Brownlow and his housekeeper notice that Oliver resembles a woman depicted in a portrait hanging in Brownlow's home.

Fagin sends a young woman named Nancy, and her abusive lover, the robber Bill Sikes, to bring Oliver back to Fagin's lair. Fagin forces him to participate in a burglary. The robbery goes wrong, and Oliver ends up under the care of the people he was supposed to rob: Miss Rose and her guardian Mrs. Maylie.

A mysterious relative of Oliver, known only as "Monks," teams up with Fagin, to prevent Oliver from learning of his past. Monks bribes Mr. Bumble and his new wife, the Widow Corney, for information on Oliver. Together, they dispose of a ring and medallion that once belonged to Oliver's mother. Nancy, racked with guilt for her role in Oliver's kidnapping, secretly spies on them and passes the information on to Rose Maylie, who tells Mr. Brownlow.

Noah Claypole, who has since joined Fagin's gang, discovers that Nancy regularly meets with the Brownlows and Maylies for the sake of Oliver's welfare. Fagin passes the information on to Sikes, who beats Nancy to death in a fit of rage and goes into hiding. He is recognized by an angry mob and accidentally hangs himself in his attempt to escape.

Mr. Brownlow forces Monks to divulge his secrets: he is Oliver's half-brother and had hoped to steal Oliver's half of their rightful inheritance. Brownlow begs Oliver to give half his inheritance to Monks and grant him a second chance, to which Oliver happily agrees. Monks emigrates to America, but squanders his money, relapses into crime, and dies in prison. Fagin is arrested and sentenced to the gallows. The day before his execution, Oliver and Mr. Brownlow visit him in Newgate Prison. Rose Maylie, who turns out to be Oliver's maternal aunt, marries and enjoys a long life. Oliver lives happily with Mr. Brownlow as his adoptive son.

Characters

 Oliver Twist – an orphan child whose mother died at his birth; father is dead when Oliver's paternity is revealed.
 Mr. Bumble – a beadle in the parish workhouse where Oliver was born
 Mrs. Mann – superintendent where the infant Oliver is placed until age 9 who is not capable of caring for the "culprits" as she is self-centered and greedy.
 Mr. Sowerberry – an undertaker who took Oliver as apprentice
 Mrs. Sowerberry – Mr. Sowerberry's wife
 Noah Claypole – a cowardly bully, Sowerberry's apprentice 
 Charlotte – the Sowerberrys' maid, lover of Noah
 Mr. Gamfield – a chimney sweep in the town where Oliver was born
 Mr. Brownlow – a kindly gentleman who takes Oliver in, his first benefactor
 Mr. Grimwig – a friend of Mr. Brownlow
 Mrs. Bedwin – Mr. Brownlow's housekeeper
 Rose Maylie – Oliver's second benefactor, later found to be his aunt
 Mrs. Lindsay Maylie – Harry Maylie's mother. Rose Maylie's adoptive aunt
 Harry Maylie – Mrs. Maylie's son
 Mr. Losberne – Mrs. Maylie's family doctor
 Mr. Giles – Mrs. Maylie's butler
 Mr. Brittles – Mrs. Maylie's handyman
 Duff and Blathers – two incompetent policemen
 Fagin – fence and boss of a criminal gang of young boys and girls
 Bill Sikes – a professional burglar
 Bull's Eye – Bill Sikes's vicious dog
 The Artful Dodger – Fagin's most adept pickpocket
 Charley Bates – a pickpocket in Fagin's gang
 Toby Crackit – an associate of Fagin and Sikes, a house-breaker
 Nancy – one of Fagin's gang, now living with Bill Sikes
 Bet – a girl in Fagin's gang, sometime friend to Nancy
 Barney – a criminal cohort of Fagin
 Agnes Fleming – Oliver's mother
 Mr. Leeford – father of Oliver and Monks
 Old Sally – a nurse who attended Oliver's birth
 Mrs. Corney – matron for the women's workhouse
 Monks – a sickly criminal, an associate of Fagin's, and long-lost half-brother of Oliver
 Monks's mother – an heiress who did not love her husband
 Mr. Fang – a magistrate
 Tom Chitling – one of Fagin's gang members, returned from abroad at the time of the murder

Major themes and symbols

In Oliver Twist, Dickens mixes grim realism with merciless satire to describe the effects of industrialism on 19th-century England and to criticise the harsh new Poor Laws. Oliver, an innocent child, is trapped in a world where his only options seem to be the workhouse, a life of crime symbolised by Fagin's gang, a prison, or an early grave. From this unpromising industrial/institutional setting, however, a fairy tale also emerges. In the midst of corruption and degradation, the essentially passive Oliver remains pure-hearted; he steers away from evil when those around him give in to it, and in proper fairy-tale fashion, he eventually receives his reward – leaving for a peaceful life in the country, surrounded by kind friends. On the way to this happy ending, Dickens explores the kind of life an outcast, orphan boy could expect to lead in 1830s London.

Poverty and social class
Poverty is a prominent concern in Oliver Twist. Throughout the novel, Dickens enlarged on this theme, describing slums so decrepit that whole rows of houses are on the point of ruin. In an early chapter, Oliver attends a pauper's funeral with Mr Sowerberry and sees a whole family crowded together in one miserable room. This prevalent misery makes Oliver's encounters with charity and love more poignant. Oliver owes his life several times over to kindness both large and small.

Symbolism
Dickens makes considerable use of symbolism. The "merry old gentleman" Fagin, for example, has satanic characteristics: he is a veteran corrupter of young boys who presides over his own corner of the criminal world; he makes his first appearance standing over a fire holding a toasting fork, and he refuses to pray on the night before his execution.

Characters

In the tradition of Restoration Comedy and Henry Fielding, Dickens fits his characters with appropriate names. Oliver himself, though "badged and ticketed" as a lowly orphan and named according to an alphabetical system, is, in fact, "all of a twist." However, Oliver and his name may have been based on a young workhouse boy named Peter Tolliver whom Dickens knew while growing up.

Bill Sikes's dog, Bull's-eye, has "faults of temper in common with his owner" and is an emblem of his owner's character. The dog's viciousness represents Sikes's animal-like brutality while Sikes's self-destructiveness is evident in the dog's many scars. The dog, with its willingness to harm anyone on Sikes's whim, shows the mindless brutality of the master. This is also illustrated when Sikes dies and the dog immediately dies as well.

Nancy, by contrast, redeems herself at the cost of her own life and dies in a prayerful pose. She is one of the few characters in Oliver Twist to display much ambivalence. Her storyline in the novel strongly reflects themes of domestic violence and psychological abuse at the hands of Bill. Although Nancy is a full-fledged criminal, indoctrinated and trained by Fagin since childhood, she retains enough empathy to repent her role in Oliver's kidnapping, and to take steps to try to atone. As one of Fagin's victims, corrupted but not yet morally dead, she gives eloquent voice to the horrors of the old man's little criminal empire. She wants to save Oliver from a similar fate; at the same time, she recoils from the idea of turning traitor, especially to Bill Sikes, whom she loves. When Dickens was later criticised for giving to a "thieving, whoring slut of the streets" such an unaccountable reversal of character, he ascribed her change of heart to "the last fair drop of water at the bottom of a dried-up, weed-choked well".

Allegations of antisemitism

Dickens has been accused of portraying antisemitic stereotypes because of his portrayal of the Jewish character Fagin in Oliver Twist. Paul Vallely writes that Fagin is widely seen as one of the most grotesque Jews in English literature, and one of the most vivid of Dickens's 989 characters. Nadia Valman, in Antisemitism: A Historical Encyclopedia of Prejudice and Persecution, argues that Fagin's representation was drawn from the image of the Jew as inherently evil, that the imagery associated him with the Devil, and with beasts.

The novel refers to Fagin 274 times in the first 38 chapters as "the Jew", while the ethnicity or religion of the other characters is rarely mentioned. In 1854, The Jewish Chronicle asked why "Jews alone should be excluded from the 'sympathizing heart' of this great author and powerful friend of the oppressed." Dickens (who had extensive knowledge of London street life and child exploitation) explained that he had made Fagin Jewish because "it unfortunately was true, of the time to which the story refers, that that class of criminal almost invariably was a Jew." It is widely believed that Fagin was based on a specific Jewish criminal of the era, Ikey Solomon. Dickens commented that by calling Fagin a Jew he had meant no imputation against the Jewish people, saying in a letter, "I have no feeling towards the Jews but a friendly one. I always speak well of them, whether in public or private, and bear my testimony (as I ought to do) to their perfect good faith in such transactions as I have ever had with them." Eliza Davis, whose husband had purchased Dickens's home in 1860 when he had put it up for sale, wrote to Dickens in protest at his portrayal of Fagin, arguing that he had "encouraged a vile prejudice against the despised Hebrew", and that he had done a great wrong to the Jewish people. While Dickens first reacted defensively upon receiving Davis's letter, he then halted the printing of Oliver Twist, and changed the text for the parts of the book that had not been set, which explains why after the first 38 chapters Fagin is barely called "the Jew" at all in the next 179 references to him. A shift in his perspective is seen in his later novel Our Mutual Friend, as he redeems the image of Jews.

Reception
Contemporary reviewers including John Forster and the Literary Gazette praised the book for its realistic depiction of social conditions. However others such as Richard Ford considered it an exaggeration of poverty.

Film, television and theatrical adaptations

Film 
Oliver Twist (1909), the first adaptation of Dickens's novel, a silent film starring Edith Storey and Elita Proctor Otis.
Oliver Twist (1912), a British silent film adaptation, directed by Thomas Bentley.
Oliver Twist (1912), an American silent film adaptation starring Nat C. Goodwin.
Oliver Twist (1916), a silent film adaptation, starring Marie Doro and Tully Marshall.
Oliver Twist (1919), a silent Hungarian film adaptation.
Oliver Twist (1922), silent film adaptation featuring Lon Chaney and Jackie Coogan.
Oliver Twist (1933), the first sound production of Dickens's novel.
Oliver Twist (1948), David Lean film adaptation starring Alec Guinness as Fagin.
Manik (1961), Bengali film directed by Bijalibaran Sen which was based on this novel. The film stars Pahari Sanyal, Chhabi Biswas, Sombhu Mitra and Tripti Mitra.
Oliver! (1968), British musical adaptation, winner in the Best Picture category at the 41st Academy Awards.
Oliver Twist (1974), an animated film co-written by Ben Starr.
Oliver Twist (1982), an Australian animated film.
Las Aventuras de Oliver Twist (1987), a Mexican animated film.
Oliver & Company (1988), Disney full-length animated feature inspired by the story of Oliver Twist. The story takes place in modern-day New York City, with Oliver (voiced by Joey Lawrence) portrayed as an orphaned kitten, the Dodger as a street-wise mongrel with a mix of terrier (voiced by Billy Joel), and Fagin (voiced by Dom DeLuise) as a homeless bum who lives on the docks with his pack of stray dogs that he trains to steal so he can survive and repay his debt to loan shark Sykes (voiced by Robert Loggia).
Twisted (1996), an independent film based on Charles Dickens's novel Oliver Twist set in the gay underground sub-culture of New York City in the 1990s and starring Emmy Award, Tony Award, Grammy Award winner Billy Porter and Academy Award nominee William Hickey (actor) directed by Seth Michael Donsky.
Oliver Twist (1997), directed by Tony Bill and starring Richard Dreyfuss and Elijah Wood.
Twist (2003), an independent film loosely based on Charles Dickens's novel Oliver Twist
Boy Called Twist (2004), a South African film which resets the story in modern-day Cape Town and turns Fagin into an Ethiopian Rastafarian.
Oliver Twist (2005), directed by Roman Polanski and starring Barney Clark and Ben Kingsley.
Twist (2021), modern day version directed by Martion Owen, and starring Michael Caine as Fagin.

Television 

 Oliver Twist, a 13 episode 1962 BBC serial directed by Eric Tayler, starring Max Adrian as Fagin and Peter Vaughan as Bill Sikes.
Oliver Twist, a 1982 TV movie directed by Clive Donner, starring George C. Scott as Fagin and Tim Curry as Bill Sikes.
 Oliver Twist, a 12 episode 1985 BBC One drama directed by Gareth Davies, starring Eric Porter and Michael Attwell.
Oliver Twist, 1999 ITV drama adaptation starring Andy Serkis and Keira Knightley.
 Oliver Twist, a five episode 2007 BBC One drama directed by Coky Giedroyc, starring Timothy Spall and Tom Hardy.
 Saban's Adventures of Oliver Twist, a 52 episode animated American-French co-production that aired between 1996 and 1997, where the story is downplayed for younger viewers, where Oliver loses his mother in a crowd rather than being dead and the characters are represented by anthropomorphic animals. Oliver in this version is a young dog.
 Escape of the Artful Dodger, an Australian TV series set as a sequel, where Dodger and Oliver are sent to the colony of Australia.
 The 2020 revival to Animaniacs featured a two-part parody of the story titled "Wakkiver Twist" in season 2, featuring Yakko, Wakko, and Dot Warner playing the roles of a trio version of Oliver while Fagin is played by the Warners' usual foil, Dr. Otto von Scratchansniff.

Theatre 

In 1838 Charles Zachary Barnett's adaptation, the three-act burletta Oliver Twist; or, The Parish Boy's Progress opened at the Marylebone Theatre in London.
 Oliver!, a 1960 West End theatre stage musical adaptation by Lionel Bart. The original cast featured Ron Moody as Fagin (he would reprise the role for the film adaptation), and boys who alternated in the juvenile lead of the Artful Dodger included Phil Collins and Davy Jones.  Many songs are well known to the public, such as "Food, Glorious Food", "Consider Yourself" and "I'd Do Anything". 
Oliver Twist is a 2017 stage adaptation of the novel written by Anya Reiss which premiered at the Regent's Park Theatre. The show was directed by Caroline Byrne.

See also
 
 
 Charles Dickens bibliography
 Child labor

References

External links

 Online versions
 Oliver Twist to read online at Bookwise
 
 Manuscript material and articles relating to Oliver Twist from the British Library's Discovering Literature website.
 Oliver Twist at Internet Archive
 
 Oliver Twist in PDF, epub, Kindle formats at Global Grey ebooks
 
 Oliver Twist, or, The Parish Boy's Progress Typeset PDF version, including the illustrations of James Mahoney (1871 Household Edition by Chapman & Hall).

 Critical analysis
 When Is a Book Not a Book? Oliver Twist in Context, a seminar by Robert Patten from the New York Public Library
 Background information and plot summary for Oliver Twist, with links to other resources
 Article in British Medical Journal on Oliver Twist's diet

 
1838 British novels
Antisemitic novels
Antisemitism in England
Art by George Cruikshank
British novels adapted into films
British novels adapted into plays
English novels
Novels about orphans
Novels adapted into comics
Novels by Charles Dickens
Novels first published in serial form
Novels set in London
Novels set in the 19th century
Victorian novels
Works originally published in Bentley's Miscellany